Dorcadion wolfi is a species of beetle in the family Cerambycidae. It was described by Krätschmer in 1985. It is known from Turkey.

See also 
Dorcadion

References

wolfi
Beetles described in 1985